King Creole is the second soundtrack album by  American singer and musician Elvis Presley, issued by RCA Victor, LPM 1884 in mono in September 1958, recorded in four days at Radio Recorders in Hollywood. It contains songs written and recorded expressly for the 1958 film of the same name starring Presley, and peaked at No. 2 on the Billboard Top Pop Albums chart. The album was previously released as an EP album with two volumes, King Creole Vol 1 and King Creole Vol 2. King Creole Vol 1 peaked at #1 for 30 weeks on the EP album charts. It followed the film's release by over ten weeks. It was certified Gold on July 15, 1999, by the Recording Industry Association of America.

Content
The bulk of the songs originated from the stable of writers contracted to Hill and Range, the publishing company jointly owned by Presley and Colonel Tom Parker: Fred Wise, Ben Weisman, Claude Demetrius, Aaron Schroeder, Sid Tepper, and Roy C. Bennett. Conspicuous in their relatively limited contribution were Jerry Leiber and Mike Stoller, who had come to an impasse with the Colonel during the making of the previous movie, Jailhouse Rock (1957), in which they had practically dominated the musical proceedings. Furious over mere songwriters having such easy access to Presley without going through Parker's "proper channels," the Colonel closed off their avenue to his prize client, especially since the duo had also tried to influence Presley's film direction, pitching him an idea to do a gritty adaptation of Nelson Algren's recent novel, A Walk on the Wild Side (1956), with Elia Kazan directing, and Leiber and Stoller providing the music. The Colonel put the kibosh on such notions, although echoes of the concept remained in the film, and the pair still managed to place three songs on the soundtrack, including the title track and "Trouble", arguably the film's best songs. Presley's performance of "Trouble" in the film alludes to Muddy Waters and Bo Diddley; he would return to the song for his tremendously successful 1968 television comeback special.

The songs "Hard Headed Woman" and "Don't Ask Me Why" appeared as two sides of a single on July 10, 1958, to coincide with the release of the film. "Hard Headed Woman", the A-side, and "Don't Ask Me Why" both made the pop singles chart, peaking at number one and number 25 respectively.

Reissues
RCA first reissued the original 11-track album on compact disc in 1988. In 1997, RCA reissued the album again in an expanded edition with an additional seven bonus tracks including the song "Danny" recorded during the same sessions, with six alternates, four previously unreleased. In 2015, King Creole was reissued on the Follow That Dream label in a special edition that contained the original album tracks along with all available alternate takes.

Personnel

 Elvis Presley – vocals, acoustic guitar
 The Jordanaires – backing vocals
 Scotty Moore – electric guitar 
 Tiny Timbrell – acoustic guitar
 Bill Black – electric bass
 Neal Matthews – double bass
 Dudley Brooks – piano
 D.J. Fontana – drums
 Bernie Mattinson – percussion

 Kitty White – vocals on "Crawfish"
 Gordon Stoker – bongos
 Hoyt Hawkins – cymbals
 Ray Siegel – double bass, tuba
 Mahlon Clark – clarinet
 John Edward (Teddy) Buckner – trumpet
 Justin Gordon – saxophone
 Elmer Schneider – trombone
 Warren Smith – trombone

Track listing

Original release

1997 reissue bonus tracks

Track 3 ("Danny") was originally issued on the LP Elvis: A Legendary Performer Volume 3 (CPL1-3082) in December 1978.

Charts and certifications

Chart positions

Certifications/sales

References

External links

LPM-1884 King Creole Guide part of The Elvis Presley Record Research Database
LSP-1884 King Creole Guide part of The Elvis Presley Record Research Database

1958 soundtrack albums
Elvis Presley soundtracks
RCA Victor soundtracks
Musical film soundtracks
Drama film soundtracks
Albums recorded at Radio Recorders